Mookambigai College of Engineering (MCE) is an engineering institute in Pudukkottai, Tamil Nadu, India. It is affiliated to Anna University. The chairman of the college is S. Subramaniam and the director is M. G. Venugopalan.

Mookambigai College of Engineering was established in 1985 under Sri Mariamman Educational, Health and Charitable Trust, Woraiyur, Tiruchirappalli. The college has eight departments of engineering, according to the needs of the students. It is run by a Telugu minority group.

The campus spreads over an area of over 200 hectares and facilitates the needs of over 500 students per year.

Events and accolades
 Mechanical Engineering — Parley
 Computer Science Engineering — Dextra
 Electronics & Communication Engineering — Logica
 Information Technology (IT) — Blitz

Campus facilities

The institute has two boys' hostels and two girls' hostels providing accommodation to over 5000 boys and 3000 girls.

The campus has an internet center and multimedia area and mini-department stores inside every hostel. There are facilities for sports and body building. The academy possesses advanced computing facilities.

Alumni association

The number of students graduated so far is 4226 and the registered number of students in the alumni association is 1479.

The MCE alumni association has two chapters, one in Chennai and the other in Bangalore.

Notable alumni

 Gautham Vasudev Menon, Indian film director

External links
 Official website

Private engineering colleges in Tamil Nadu
Colleges affiliated to Anna University
Education in Pudukkottai district
Educational institutions established in 1985
1985 establishments in Tamil Nadu